Kelantan Football Club Under-23s is the most senior of Kelantan's youth team. They play in the Malaysian Football League Cup. 

Kelantan Football Club Under-21s team competes in the Piala Presiden (English: President Cup). They have won the Cup 7 times, in 1985, 1995, 2005, 2011, 2013, 2015 and 2016 and ended being runners-up in 1988, 2003 and 2006–07. The team mainly consists of Under-21 players at the club, and some of the players also registered for the senior team.

Kelantan Football Club Under-19s team  competes in the Piala Belia (English: Youth Cup). They have won the Cup 2 times in 2008 and 2014 and ended being runners-up in 2013.

Under-23s

Current squad

Coaching staff

Under-21s

Under-19s

Coach history

Under-23s
  Yogeswaran Veeramalai (2023)

Under-21s
  Anizan Daud (2010)
  Zahasmi Ismail (2011)
  Mohd Hashim Mustapha (2011–2012)
  Mohd Sideek Shamsuddin (2012–2014)
  Mohd Nafuzi Mohd Zain (2015)
  Mohd Hashim Mustapha (2016–2017)
  Zahasmi Ismail (2018)
  Mohd Hashim Mustapha (2019)
  Kamaruddin Mohammad (2020)
  Abdul Aziz Mustafa (2022)

Under-19s
  Tengku Hazman Raja Hassan (2013–2016)
  Sazami Shafi'i (2016–2017)
  Zahariman Ghazali (2018)
  Mohd Sideek A. Samsudim (2019)
  Mohd Anizam Daud (2020)

Notable former players
The following is a list of players who have played in the Kelantan F.C. youth team (U19s, U21s and U23s). Players who are currently playing at Kelantan F.C., or for another club on loan from Kelantan F.C., are highlighted in bold.

 Mohd Farisham Ismail
 Ramadhan Hamid
 Khairul Fahmi Che Mat
 Mohd Shahrizan Ismail
 Ahmad Syihan Hazmi Mohamed
 Nik Shahrul Azim Abdul Halim
 Mohd Qayyum Marjoni Sabil
 Mohd Daudsu Jamaluddin
 Zairul Fitree Ishak
 Mohamad Faris Shah Rosli
 Faizol Nazlin Sayuti
 Mohamad Azwan Aripin
 Mohd Rozaimi Azwar
 Mohd Badhri Mohd Radzi
 Muhamad Fadhilah Mohd Pauzi
 Fakhrul Zaman
 Mohd Khairul Izuan Rosli
 Danial Ashraf
 Amir Zikri Pauzi
 Nik Azli Nik Alias
 Muhammad Syazwan Yusoff
 Mohd Zafran Akramin Abdul Razak
 Wan Zaharulnizam Zakaria
 Tuan Muhamad Faim Tuan Zainal Abidin
 Mohamad Faiz Suhaimi
 Mohd Zamri Ramli
 Mohd Shakir Shaari
 Rizal Fahmi Rosid
 Muhd Izuan Salahuddin
 Norhadi Ubaidillah
 Mohamad Aris Zaidi
 Mohd Nurul Azwan Roya
 Ramzul Zahini Adnan
 Mohd Nizad Ayub
 Azlan Ismail
 Khairan Eroza Razali
 Wan Zaman Wan Mustapha
 Zul Yusri Che Harun
 Khairan Ezuan Razali
 Nicholas Chan
 Ahmad Ezrie Shafizie
 Nik Ahmad Fadly Nik Leh
 Halim Napi
 Mohd Faiz Mohd Nasir
 Afiq Saluddin
 Muhaimin Izuddin

Top scorers

Under-21s

Under-19s

Captainship

Under-23s

Under-21s

Under-19s

Honours

Under-21s
Piala Presiden
 Winners (7): 1985, 1995, 2005, 2011, 2013, 2015, 2016
 Runners-up : 1988, 2003, 2006–07

Under-19s
Piala Belia
 Winners (2): 2008, 2014
 Runners-up : 2013

References

External links
 Official website

Youth and Academy
Malaysian reserve football teams
Football academies in Malaysia
1985 establishments in Malaysia